The Copa Paraíba was a tournament organized by Federação Paraibana de Futebol in order to decide one of the representatives of the state at the Copa do Brasil.

List of champions

References

Football in Paraíba